Harry Crank (November 1890 – 22 October 1917) was a British diver. He competed in the men's 3 metre springboard event at the 1908 Summer Olympics. He was killed in action during the First World War.

Personal life
Crank served as a second lieutenant in the Lancashire Fusiliers during the First World War. He was killed in action on 22 October 1917 in Belgium. His body was never recovered, and he is commemorated at Tyne Cot Memorial.

See also
 List of Olympians killed in World War I

References

External links
 

1890 births
1917 deaths
British male divers
Olympic divers of Great Britain
Divers at the 1908 Summer Olympics
Sportspeople from Bolton
British military personnel killed in World War I
British Army personnel of World War I
Lancashire Fusiliers officers